Zahari Dimitrov (born 19 October 1975) is a Bulgarian footballer who plays as a forward.

Career
Dimitrov had previously played for FC Preslav, PFC Shumen, Lokomotiv Plovdiv and PFC Svetkavitsa. He made his debut in A PFG with Shumen on 8 August 1998 in a match against Spartak Varna.

Dimitrov signed with Beroe Stara Zagora in 2004. After a match of A PFG against Levski Sofia on 9 April 2006, Zahari Dimitrov was tested positive for clenbuterol. He was suspended from all official football competitions for a period of two years by UEFA.

Dimitrov returned to football in 2008–09 season, scoring 8 goals in 19 matches of B PFG. Zahari's goals helped Beroe achieve promotion for the top division. During the winter break of the 2009–10 season, he was released from Beroe and returned to Shumen, staying at the club even after being relegated to the third tier of Bulgarian football due to licensing issues. During the 2011–12 season, Dimitrov was part of the squad that won the Northeastern V Football Group and achieved promotion to the 2012–13 B PFG, returning the club to professional football after a two-year absence. He then signed a contract with Vereya, eventually becoming the captain of the team and winning the 20th edition of the Amateur Cup with it.

References

External links
 Profile at beroe.eu

1975 births
Living people
Bulgarian footballers
First Professional Football League (Bulgaria) players
Second Professional Football League (Bulgaria) players
PFC Lokomotiv Plovdiv players
PFC Svetkavitsa players
PFC Beroe Stara Zagora players
FC Vereya players
Doping cases in association football

Association football forwards